Unfriendly Relations (Swedish: Släkten är värst) is a 1936 Swedish comedy film directed by Anders Henrikson and starring Håkan Westergren, Karin Swanström and Gull-Maj Norin. It was shot at the Råsunda Studios in Stockholm. The film's sets were designed by the art director Arne Åkermark. It was based on the play Aunt Jutta from Calcutta by Max Reimann and Otto Schwartz, later adapted into a 1953 German film of the same title.

Synopsis
A bachelor living in Stockholm invents a family in order to get financial support from his wealthy aunt. Things are complicated, however, when she pays an unexpected visit to the city.

Cast
 Håkan Westergren as 	Hasse, advokat
 Karin Swanström as 	Hans tant
 Gull-Maj Norin as 	May, hennes fosterdotter
 Nils Ericsson as 	Mille, skådespelare 
 Maritta Marke as 	Hans fästmö
 Thor Modéen as 	Vallbäck-Nord, f.d. 'utbrytarkung'
 Eric Abrahamsson as 	Oscar, betjänt 
 Carin Swensson as 	Lena 
 Helge Andersson as 	Court Constable 
 Valdemar Bentzen as Janitor 
 Oscar Byström as 	Judge 
 Eric Dahlström as 	Lawyer 
 Eddie Figge as 	Woman at the Theatre 
 Knut Frankman as 	Customs Clerk 
 Hjördis Gille as 	Woman in Court 
 John Hilke as 	Court Clerk 
 Lilly Kjellström as 	Mrs. Andersson 
 Thyra Leijman-Uppström as 	Woman in Court 
 Arne Lindblad as 	Unit Manager at the Theatre 
 Helge Mauritz as 	Actor at the Theatre 
 Christian Schrøder as 	Janitor 
 John Westin as 	Customs Clerk 
 Oscar Åberg as 	District Attorney

References

Bibliography 
 Larsson, Mariah & Marklund, Anders. Swedish Film: An Introduction and Reader. Nordic Academic Press, 2010.

External links 
 

1936 films
Swedish comedy films
1936 comedy films
1930s Swedish-language films
Films directed by Anders Henrikson
Swedish black-and-white films
Films set in Stockholm
Swedish films based on plays
1930s Swedish films